A Bailey bridge is a type of portable, pre-fabricated, truss bridge. It was developed in 1940–1941 by the British for military use during the Second World War and saw extensive use by British, Canadian and American military engineering units. A Bailey bridge has the advantages of requiring no special tools or heavy equipment to assemble. The wood and steel bridge elements were small and light enough to be carried in trucks and lifted into place by hand, without the use of a crane. The bridges were strong enough to carry tanks. Bailey bridges continue to be used extensively in civil engineering construction projects and to provide temporary crossings for pedestrian and vehicle traffic. A Bailey bridge and its construction were prominently featured in the 1977 film A Bridge Too Far.

Design 

The success of the Bailey bridge was due to the simplicity of the fabrication and assembly of its modular components, combined with the ability to erect and deploy sections with a minimum of assistance from heavy equipment. Many previous designs for military bridges required cranes to lift the pre-assembled bridge and lower it into place. The Bailey parts were made of standard steel alloys, and were simple enough that parts made at a number of different factories were interchangeable. Each individual part could be carried by a small number of men, enabling army engineers to move more easily and quickly, in preparing the way for troops and matériel advancing behind them. The modular design allowed engineers to build each bridge to be as long and as strong as needed, doubling or tripling the supportive side panels, or on the roadbed sections.

The basic bridge consists of three main parts. The bridge's strength is provided by the panels on the sides. The panel was constructed of welded steel. The top and bottom chord of each panel had interlocking male and female lugs into which engineers could insert panel connecting pins.

The floor of the bridge consists of a number of  transoms that run across the bridge, with  stringers running between them on the bottom, forming a square. Transoms rest on the lower chord of the panels, and clamps hold them together. Stringers are placed atop the completed structural frame, and wood planking is placed atop the stringers to provide a roadbed. Ribands bolt the planking to the stringers. Later in the war, the wooden planking was covered by steel plates, which were more resistant to damage of tank tracks.

Each unit constructed in this fashion creates a single  section of bridge, with a  roadbed. After one section is complete it is typically pushed forward over rollers on the bridgehead, and another section built behind it. The two are then connected together with pins pounded into holes in the corners of the panels.

For added strength up to three panels (and transoms) can be bolted on either side of the bridge. Another solution is to stack the panels vertically. Footways can be installed on the outside of the side-panels. The side-panels form an effective barrier between foot and vehicle traffic, allowing pedestrians to safely use the bridge.

A useful feature of the Bailey bridge is its ability to be launched from one side of a gap. In this system the front-most portion of the bridge is angled up with wedges into a "launching nose" and most of the bridge is left without the roadbed and ribands. The bridge is placed on rollers and simply pushed across the gap, using manpower or a truck or tracked vehicle, at which point the roller is removed (with the help of jacks) and the ribands and roadbed installed, along with any additional panels and transoms that might be needed.

During WWII, Bailey bridge parts were made by companies with little experience of this kind of engineering. Although the parts were simple, they had to be precisely manufactured to fit correctly, so they were assembled into a test bridge at the factory to verify this. To do this efficiently, newly manufactured parts would be continuously added to the test bridge, while at the same time the far end of the test bridge was continuously dismantled and the parts dispatched to the end-users.

History 

Donald Bailey was a civil servant in the British War Office who tinkered with model bridges as a hobby. He had proposed an early prototype for a Bailey bridge before the war in 1936, but the idea was not acted upon. Bailey drew an original proposal for the bridge on the back of an envelope in 1940. On 14 February 1941, the Ministry of Supply requested that Bailey have a full-scale prototype completed by 1 May. Work on the bridge was completed with particular support from Ralph Freeman. The design was tested at the Experimental Bridging Establishment (EBE), in Christchurch, Dorset, with several parts from Braithwaite & Co., beginning in December 1940 and ending in 1941. The first prototype was tested in 1941.

The prototype of this was used to span Mother Siller's Channel, which cuts through the nearby Stanpit Marshes, an area of marshland at the confluence of the River Avon and the River Stour. It remains there as a functioning bridge. Full production began in July 1941. Thousands of workers and over 650 firms, including Littlewoods, were engaged in making the bridge, with production eventually rising to 25,000 bridge panels a month. The first Bailey bridges were in military service by December 1941, Bridges in the other formats were built, temporarily, to cross the Avon and Stour in the meadows nearby. After successful development and testing, the bridge was taken into service by the Corps of Royal Engineers and first used in North Africa in 1942.

The original design violated a patent on the Callender-Hamilton bridge. The designer of that bridge, A. M. Hamilton, successfully applied to the Royal Commission on Awards to Inventors. The Bailey Bridge was more easily constructed, but less portable than the Hamilton bridge. Hamilton was awarded £4,000 in 1936 by the War Office for the use of his early bridges and the Royal Commission on Awards to Inventors awarded him £10,000 in 1954 for the use, mainly in Asia, of his later bridges. Lieutenant General Sir Giffard Le Quesne Martel was awarded £500 for infringement on the design of his box girder bridge, the Martel bridge. Bailey was later knighted for his invention, and awarded £12,000.

Use in the Second World War 

The first operational Bailey bridge during the Second World War was built by 237 Field Company R.E. over Medjerda River near Medjez el Bab in Tunisia on the night of 26 November 1942. The first Bailey bridge built under fire was constructed at Leonforte by members of the 3rd Field Company, Royal Canadian Engineers. The Americans soon adopted the Bailey bridge technique, calling it the Portable Panel Bridge. In early 1942, the United States Army Corps of Engineers initially awarded contracts to the Detroit Steel Products Company, the American Elevator Company and the Commercial Shearing and Stamping Company, and later several others.

The Bailey provided a solution to the problem of German and Italian armies destroying bridges as they retreated. One Bailey, built to replace the Sangro River bridge in Italy, spanned . Another on the Chindwin River in Burma, spanned . Such long bridges required support from either piers or pontoons.

A number of bridges were available by 1944 for D-Day, when production was accelerated. The US also licensed the design and started rapid construction for their own use. A Bailey Bridge constructed over the River Rhine at Rees, Germany, in 1945 by the Royal Canadian Engineers was named "Blackfriars Bridge", and, at 558 m (1814 ft) including the ramps at each end, was then the longest Bailey bridge ever constructed. In all, over 600 firms were involved in the making of over 200 miles of bridges composing of 500,000 tons, or 700,000 panels of bridging during the war. At least 2,500 Bailey bridges were built in Italy, and another 2,000 elsewhere.

Field Marshal Bernard Montgomery wrote in 1947:

Post-war applications
The Skylark launch tower at Woomera was built up of Bailey bridge components. In the years immediately following World War II, the Ontario Hydro-Electric Power Commission purchased huge amounts of war-surplus Bailey bridging from the Canadian War Assets Corporation. The commission used bridging in an office building. Over 200,000 tons of bridging were used in a hydroelectric project. The Ontario government was, several years after World War II, the largest holder of Bailey Bridging components. After Hurricane Hazel in 1954, some of the bridging was used to construct replacement bridges in the Toronto area. The Old Finch Avenue Bailey Bridge, built by the 2nd Field Engineer Regiment, is the last still in use.

The longest Bailey bridge was put into service in October 1975. This , two-lane bridge crossed the Derwent River at Hobart, Australia. The Bailey bridge was in use until the reconstruction of the Tasman Bridge was completed on 8 October 1977. Bailey bridges are in regular use throughout the world, particularly as a means of bridging in remote regions. In 2018, the Indian Army erected three new footbridges at Elphinstone Road, a commuter railway station in Mumbai, and at Currey Road and Ambivli. These were erected quickly, in response to a stampede some months earlier, where 23 people died. The United States Army Corps of Engineers uses Bailey Bridges in construction projects, including an emergency replacement bridge on the Hana Highway in Hawaii. Two temporary Bailey bridges have been used on the northern span of the Dufferin Street bridges in Toronto since 2014.

In 2017 the Irish Army built a Bailey bridge to replace a road bridge across the river Cabry, in County Donegal, after the original bridge was destroyed in floods.

In 2021 a Bailey bridge was built across the river Dijle in Rijmenam (Belgium) for the transportation of excavated soil from one side to the other of the river. The bridge allowed the trucks to cross the river without having to pass the city center.

In March 2021, the Michigan Department of Transportation constructed a Bailey bridge on M-30 to temporarily reconnect the highway after the old structure was destroyed in the May 2020 flooding and subsequent failure of the Edenville Dam. The department will replace the temporary bridge with a permanent structure in the coming years.

Following the 2023 North Island floods and Cyclone Gabrielle in the North Island of New Zealand, Bailey bridges were installed to reconnect communities.

Gallery

See also 

 AM 50
 Armoured vehicle-launched bridge
 Mabey Logistic Support Bridge
 Medium Girder Bridge a modern bridge of analogous use
 Military engineer
 Pontoon bridge for another bridge type with mobile military application

References

Bibliography

External links 

 Bailey Bridges in New Zealand
 Animated build of a modern Mabey Compact 200 Bridge (similar to the original Bailey Bridge)
 US Army Field Manual FM5-277 Dated 9 May 1986.

Portable bridges
Truss bridges by type
Bridges by structural type
Military bridging equipment
English inventions